My Daughter, My Angel is a 2007 Canadian French language thriller film, directed by Alexis Durand-Brault and starring Michel Côté and Karine Vanasse.

Plot 
Germain Dagenais, a former solicitor (Côté), discovers evidence from a crime scene which included a dead body, of a videotape that included pornography. He is interested in viewing porn during his private time and accidentally finds his own daughter Nathalie (Karine Vanasse) in a video announcing she will be in a future video. Panicked, Germain must find his daughter and save her before she meets the same fate.

Awards 
 Genie Award for Best Performance by an Actress in a Supporting Role - Laurence Leboeuf - Nominee

References

External links 
 
 
  
 

2007 films
Films set in Montreal
2000s French-language films
2007 thriller drama films
Films about pornography
Canadian thriller drama films
Films directed by Alexis Durand-Brault
Films scored by Normand Corbeil
2007 drama films
French-language Canadian films
2000s Canadian films